Ascanius may refer to:

In Classical mythology:
 Ascanius, the son of Aeneas
 Ascanius, a son of Priam 
 Ascanius, a son of Aretaon 
 Lake Ascanius in Anatolia. 
 Peter Ascanius (1723–1803), Norwegian biologist.
 Domenicus van Wijnen, called Ascanius (1661 – c.1695), Dutch painter.